Pareronia avatar, the pale wanderer, is a medium-sized butterfly of the family Pieridae, that is, the yellows and whites, which is found in South and Southeast Asia.

References 
 

avatar
Butterflies of Asia
Butterflies of Indochina
Butterflies described in 1858